Hyderabad Tyagaraja Aaradhana Music Festival (HTAMF) is an annual 5 day Carnatic music festival held in Hyderabad, Telangana at Shilparamam. It is held on the lines of the popular Tyagaraja Aradhana by Sanskriti Foundation which was found in 2005 and registered in 2008 by ViloinVasu a violinist, music teacher and researcher.

History
The festival started in 2016 for Carnatic classical music fans in Hyderabad, who otherwise travel to Tyagaraja Aaradhana in Tamil Nadu. It was started by Carnatic classical music artist, Violin Vasu. The events include Nagara sankeerthana is followed by Pancharatna Brindaganam. The music festival carries the same fervour and spirit into the Pancharatna Brindaganam in traditional Thiruvaiyaru style.

2016 event
It was the inaugural 3 day event, with 5 events.

2017 event
Over 250 artists participated in the event. All the artists performed Pancharatna Kriti in unison paying tribute to Saint Tyagaraja.
 Dr Annavarappu Ramaswamy
 Prof Yella Venkataswara Rao
 Kalarathna Dr DV Mohana Krishna

2018 event 
The event is held for 4 days. Over 300 musicians and live painting for Pancharatna Kritis by renowned artist Sri Kuchi on 21 January. It would have six events with over 20 concerts in the evenings.

 D. Ravikanth
 Padma
 Sangeetakala sisters
 Manasi Prasad

2019 event 

The non-profit charity music festival is announced to be held for 5 days in remembrance of Saint Tyagaraja from 30-Jan-19 to 3-Feb-19  with more than 400 carnatic musicians and live painting for Pancharatna Kritis. It starts with inauguration from evening of 30-Jan-19, followed by student teacher community concerts on 2-Feb-19 and Brindaganam on 3-Feb-19 morning. The event hosts concerts by experienced musicians on all the 5 days. Felicitation to Mridanagam Vidwan V.Kamalakara Rao on the 5th day of the festival. This festival is covered and supported by news media and organisations such as TV5 News, Hindu Dharmam, Telangana Today, Vaishnavi caterers and Chutneys restaurant.

It would have six events including Kuchipudi dance with over 18 concerts in the evenings.

30 Jan 2019

Vocal Concerts by Vidushi Malladi Karthika Triveni, Vidwan Kalyan Vasanth K.V., Vidushi Dr. S. Umadevi, Vidwan Komanduri Seshadri

Accompaniments: Vidwan Bhatti Pawan Singh (violin), Vidwan Srinivasa Gopalan (mridangam)

Vidwan Krishna Sravan Kopparapu (mridangam), Vidwan Dr. Eamanujapuram Srikanth (kanjira)

31 Jan 2019

Vocal Concerts by Vidushi Dr. Swarna Mangalampalli, Vidushi Mridula Ashwin, Vidwan NCH Parthasarathy, Jalatarangini Concert by Jalataranga Kala Praveena Vidwan Nemani Somayajulu.

Accompaniments Vidwan Oruganti Rajasekhar (violin), Vidwan Ch Ramakrishna (mridangam), Vidwan Krishna Sravan Kopparapu (mridangam), Vidwan Vemuganti Sridharacharya (ghatam)

1 Feb 2019

Vocal Concerts by Vidwan D.L. Prachotan, Vidushi Dr. Ramaprabha Yerramilli, Gotu Vadyam & Flute Duet by Vidushi Emani Lalitha Krishna  & Vidushi Emani Poornima Krishna

Kuchipudi Dance Performance by Abhinaya Vani Nritya Niketan

Accompaniments:

Vidushi Radhika Srinivasan (Violin), Vidwan P. VidyaSagar (mridangam), Vidwan Krishna Sravan Kopparapu (mridangam), Vidwan Wg Cdr Minjur M Yagnaraman (morsing)

2 Feb 2019

Vocal Concerts by Vidwan Sathiraju Venumadhav, Vidushi Dr. Neeta Chandrasekhar, Vidushi Dr. Duddu Radhika,

Kuchipudi Dance Performance by students of Vidushi Tulasi Popuri

Accompaniments

Vidwan K. Anantha Sowrirajan (violin), Vidwan Nemani Somayajulu (mridangam), Master Karthikeya, Vidwan K V Ramakrishna (ghatam)

3 Feb 2019

Vocal Concerts by Vidushi Srivani Sarma, Vidwan Sangeethacharya, Dr. Vyzarsu Balasubrahmanyam, Vidushi Dr. K. Seshulatha Viswanath, Vidwan Modumudi Sudhakar

Accompaniments :

Vidwan NandaKumar (violin), Chiranjeevi Aditi Vasudevan (violin),  Vidwan Jaya Bhaskar (mridangam), Vidwan Krishna Sravan Kopparapu (mridangam), Master Karthikeya (mridangam), Vidwan K V Ramakrishna (ghatam), Vidwan Wg Cdr Minjur M Yagnaraman (morsing)

References

Music festivals in India
Carnatic classical music festivals
Music festivals established in 2016
Hindu music festivals
Festivals in Hyderabad, India